The gradient theorem, also known as the fundamental theorem of calculus for line integrals, says that a line integral through a gradient field can be evaluated by evaluating the original scalar field at the endpoints of the curve. The theorem is a generalization of the second fundamental theorem of calculus to any curve in a plane or space (generally n-dimensional) rather than just the real line.

The gradient theorem implies that line integrals through gradient fields are path-independent. In physics this theorem is one of the ways of defining a conservative force. By placing  as potential,  is a conservative field. Work done by conservative forces does not depend on the path followed by the object, but only the end points, as the above equation shows.

The gradient theorem also has an interesting converse: any path-independent vector field can be expressed as the gradient of a scalar field. Just like the gradient theorem itself, this converse has many striking consequences and applications in both pure and applied mathematics.

Proof
To do this,  is defined on an interval that is larger than and includes .), then by the multivariate chain rule, the composite function  is differentiable on :

Here the  denotes the usual inner product.

where the definition of a line integral is used in the first equality, the above equation is used in the second equality, and the second fundamental theorem of calculus is used in the third equality.

Even if the gradient theorem (also called fundamental theorem of calculus for line integrals) has been proved for a differentiable (so looked as smooth) curve so far, the theorem is also proved for a piecewise-smooth curve since this curve is made by joining multiple differentiable curves so the proof for this curve is made by the proof per differentiable curve component.

Examples

Example 1
Using the definition of a line integral,

This result can be obtained much more simply by noticing that the function  has gradient , so by the Gradient Theorem:

Example 2
If  is a real number, then

Here the final equality follows by the gradient theorem, since the function  is differentiable on  if .

If  then this equality will still hold in most cases, but caution must be taken if γ passes through or encloses the origin, because the integrand vector field  will fail to be defined there. However, the case  is somewhat different; in this case, the integrand becomes , so that the final equality becomes .

Note that if , then this example is simply a slight variant of the familiar power rule from single-variable calculus.

Example 3
Using Coulomb's law, we can easily determine that the force on the particle at position  will be

Then the work done on the particle is

Now for each , direct computation shows that

Thus, continuing from above and using the gradient theorem,

We are finished. Of course, we could have easily completed this calculation using the powerful language of electrostatic potential or electrostatic potential energy (with the familiar formulas ). However, we have not yet defined potential or potential energy, because the converse of the gradient theorem is required to prove that these are well-defined, differentiable functions and that these formulas hold (see below). Thus, we have solved this problem using only Coulomb's Law, the definition of work, and the gradient theorem.

Converse of the gradient theorem
This theorem has a powerful converse:

It is straightforward to show that a vector field is path-independent if and only if the integral of the vector field over every closed loop in its domain is zero.

Proof of the converse 
We know that  is well-defined because  is path-independent.

By the definition of the directional derivative,To calculate the integral within the final limit, we must parametrize . Now, since , the limit becomeswhere the first equality is from the definition of the derivative with a fact that the integral is equal to 0 at  = 0, and the second equality is from the first fundamental theorem of calculus.

Example of the converse principle

To illustrate the power of this converse principle, we cite an example that has significant physical consequences. In classical electromagnetism, the electric force is a path-independent force; i.e. the work done on a particle that has returned to its original position within an electric field is zero (assuming that no changing magnetic fields are present).

Therefore, the above theorem implies that the electric force field  is conservative (here  is some open, path-connected subset of  that contains a charge distribution).

In many cases, the domain  is assumed to be unbounded and the reference point  is taken to be "infinity", which can be made rigorous using limiting techniques. This function  is an indispensable tool used in the analysis of many physical systems.

Generalizations

Many of the critical theorems of vector calculus generalize elegantly to statements about the integration of differential forms on manifolds. In the language of differential forms and exterior derivatives, the gradient theorem states that

This powerful statement is a generalization of the gradient theorem from 1-forms defined on one-dimensional manifolds to differential forms defined on manifolds of arbitrary dimension.

The converse statement of the gradient theorem also has a powerful generalization in terms of differential forms on manifolds. Then there exists a form  such that . Thus, on a contractible domain, every closed form is exact. This result is summarized by the Poincaré lemma.

See also
State function
Scalar potential
Jordan curve theorem
Differential of a function
Classical mechanics

References

Theorems in calculus
Articles containing proofs